This is the results breakdown of the local elections held in Navarre on 10 June 1987. The following tables show detailed results in the autonomous community's most populous municipalities, sorted alphabetically.

Overall

City control
The following table lists party control in the most populous municipalities, including provincial capitals (shown in bold). Gains for a party are displayed with the cell's background shaded in that party's colour.

Municipalities

Barañain
Population: 13,969

Burlada
Population: 13,949

Estella
Population: 12,603

Pamplona
Population: 178,439

Tafalla
Population: 10,256

Tudela
Population: 26,041

See also
1987 Navarrese regional election

References

Navarre
1987